Niko Eeckhout (born 16 December 1970) is a Belgian former professional road racing cyclist, who rode professionally between 1992 and 2013.  He was the 2005–2006 UCI Europe Tour series and the 2006 Belgian National Cycling Championship Road Race  champion, and currently works for the  Team as a coach.

Career 
Born in Izegem, Eeckhout started his career in 1993 riding for the small Collstrop-team. He immediately started winning minor Belgian races like the Championship of Flanders and the Omloop Mandel-Leie-Schelde. Eeckhout had a breakthrough season when he transferred to Lotto-Adecco in 2001, winning 11 races, including Dwars door Vlaanderen and the GP van Steenbergen.

Eeckhout struggled through the next two seasons and at the end of 2004 his contract with Lotto-Adecco ended and he needed to find a new team. He signed with the Belgian squad Chocolade Jacques and found his second youth. He started the 2005 season by winning Dwars door Vlaanderen, and went on to win major races including the Grand Prix d'Isbergues and a stage of the Three Days of De Panne.
In 2006 he continued his winning form, taking the Three Days of West-Flanders. In June 2006 he won the biggest race in his career, the Belgian National Road Championship in Antwerp by beating Tom Boonen and Philippe Gilbert. Eeckhout had another great season in 2006, winning 12 races, including the 2005-2006 UCI Europe Tour.
In the peloton he earned the nickname "Rambo" for being particularly tough during hard races in severe conditions.

Major achievements 

1992
 1st Kattekoers
 1st Stage 3 Tour de Liège
 3rd Nationale Sluitingprijs
1993
 1st Omloop der Vlaamse Ardennen Ichtegem
 1st Omloop van de Vlaamse Scheldeboorden
 1st Stages 2 & 3 Tour du Poitou-Charentes
 2nd GP Rik Van Steenbergen
1994
 4th Kuurne–Brussels–Kuurne
1995
 2nd GP Stad Zottegem
1996
 1st Kampioenschap van Vlaanderen
 1st Omloop van het Waasland
 1st Grand Prix de la Ville de Lillers
 3rd A Travers le Morbihan
 4th Paris–Bourges
 4th Le Samyn
 5th Veenendaal–Veenendaal
 6th GP Rik Van Steenbergen
 8th Grote Prijs Jef Scherens
1997
 1st Omloop van het Waasland
 1st Grand Prix de la Ville de Lillers
 4th Nokere Koerse
 6th Kuurne–Brussels–Kuurne
 9th Cholet-Pays de Loire
1998
 1st Kampioenschap van Vlaanderen
1999
 1st Omloop van de Westhoek
 2nd De Kustpijl
 2nd Omloop van het Waasland
 2nd Leeuwse Pijl
 3rd Grand Prix de Denain
 4th Kampioenschap van Vlaanderen
2000
 1st Kampioenschap van Vlaanderen
 1st Grand Prix Rudy Dhaenens
 1st Omloop van het Houtland
 1st Omloop van de Westhoek
 2nd Ronde van Midden-Zeeland
 2nd Veenendaal–Veenendaal
 3rd Sparkassen Giro Bochum
 3rd GP Aarhus
 3rd Grand Prix Midtbank
 4th Grand Prix Pino Cerami
 4th Nokere Koerse
 5th Paris–Brussels
2001
 1st  Overall Étoile de Bessèges
1st  Points classification
1st Stage 1
 1st Dwars door Vlaanderen
 1st Ronde van Midden-Zeeland
 1st Memorial Rik Van Steenbergen
 1st Grote Prijs Jef Scherens
 1st Stage 3 Circuit Franco-Belge
 2nd Paris–Brussels
 3rd Schaal Sels
 3rd Cholet-Pays de Loire
 3rd Nokere Koerse
 9th Overall Danmark Rundt
1st Stage 2
 9th Overall Three Days of De Panne
1st  Points classification
 9th Paris–Tours
2002
 4th Overall Three Days of De Panne
 6th Dwars door Vlaanderen
 8th Nokere Koerse
 9th GP Rik Van Steenbergen
 9th Schaal Sels
2003
 1st Memorial Rik Van Steenbergen
 1st Stage 1 Tour de Wallonie
 2nd Omloop van de Vlaamse Scheldeboorden
 3rd Grote Prijs Jef Scherens
2004
 1st Ronde van Midden-Zeeland
 1st Stage 4 Ster Elektrotoer
 2nd Memorial Rik Van Steenbergen
 6th Dwars door Vlaanderen
 7th Overall Circuit Franco-Belge
 10th Paris–Brussels
2005
 1st Dwars door Vlaanderen
 1st Grand Prix d'Isbergues
 1st Grote Prijs Beeckman-De Caluwé
 1st Omloop van de Vlaamse Scheldeboorden
 1st Stage 2 Three Days of De Panne
 4th Paris–Brussels
 4th Omloop Het Volk
 4th Kuurne–Brussels–Kuurne
 5th Overall Tour of Belgium
 5th Scheldeprijs
 6th Nationale Sluitingprijs
 8th Veenendaal–Veenendaal
 8th Omloop van het Waasland
2006
 1st Overall UCI Europe Tour
 1st  Road race, National Road Championships
 1st Overall Driedaagse van West-Vlaanderen
1st Stage 3
 1st Kampioenschap van Vlaanderen
 1st Omloop van het Waasland
 1st Memorial Rik Van Steenbergen
 Circuit Franco-Belge
1st  Points classification
1st Stage 3
 2nd Omloop van het Houtland
 2nd Cholet-Pays de Loire
 4th Ronde van Midden-Zeeland
 4th Kuurne–Brussels–Kuurne
 4th Scheldeprijs
 4th Dwars door Vlaanderen
 6th Omloop van de Vlaamse Scheldeboorden
 7th Overall Tour of Belgium
 8th Halle–Ingooigem
2007
 1st Omloop van het Waasland
 2nd Memorial Rik Van Steenbergen
 3rd Omloop van het Houtland
 4th Overall Driedaagse van West-Vlaanderen
 6th Kampioenschap van Vlaanderen
2008
 1st Omloop van het Waasland
 2nd Overall Driedaagse van West-Vlaanderen
 3rd Road race, National Road Championships
 3rd Dutch Food Valley Classic
 3rd Dwars door Vlaanderen
 4th Ronde van het Groene Hart
 5th Omloop van de Vlaamse Scheldeboorden
 5th Kampioenschap van Vlaanderen
 6th Overall Tour de Picardie
 7th Nokere Koerse
 10th Omloop van het Houtland
2009
 1st Grote Prijs Stad Zottegem
 1st Memorial Briek Schotte-Desselgem
 1st Memorial Rik Van Steenbergen
 FBD Insurance Ras
1st  Points classification
1st Stage 1
 1st Stages 4 & 5 Vuelta a Extremadura
 2nd Dwars door Vlaanderen
 3rd Omloop van het Houtland
 6th Omloop van het Waasland
 7th Sparkassen Giro
 10th Nokere Koerse
2010
 1st Stage 5 Étoile de Bessèges
 1st Stage 3 Ronde de l'Oise
 2nd Ronde van het Groene Hart
 7th Omloop Het Nieuwsblad
2011
 3rd Handzame Classic
 4th Omloop van het Waasland
 8th Overall Driedaagse van West-Vlaanderen
1st Stage 2
2012
 1st Wanzeel Koerse
 1st Omloop der Kempen
 1st Schaal Sels
 3rd Dwars door het Hageland
 5th Ronde van Noord-Holland
 7th Overall Ronde de l'Oise
 8th Kampioenschap van Vlaanderen
2013
 2nd Omloop van het Waasland
 2nd Zuid Oost Drenthe Classic I
 5th Grote Prijs Wase Polders
 6th Arno Wallaard Memorial

References

External links 
  

1970 births
Living people
People from Izegem
Belgian male cyclists
Cyclists from West Flanders